Wilkes Bashford is a clothing retailer headquartered in San Francisco, California, United States. In November 2009, Wilkes Bashford was acquired by Mitchells Stores.

The flagship store was opened in 1966 by its namesake Wilkes Bashford. It is favored by some prominent individuals such as former San Francisco Mayor Willie Brown. The original store is in the Union Square Shopping District in San Francisco, California. Later the company expanded to Stanford Shopping Center in Palo Alto, California.

The store was one of the first in the United States to carry Ermenegildo Zegna. It is sold alongside other brands such as: Brioni, Brunello Cucinelli, Loro Piana, Kiton, Missoni, Pucci, Oxxford Clothes, Oscar de la Renta, Valentino, and more. The store has a shoe department featuring Manolo Blahnik, Christian Louboutin, Bontoni, John Lobb and Gravati.

The store's namesake Wilkes Bashford died of prostate cancer on January 16, 2016, at the age of 82.

Controversies  
In 1985, founder Wilkes Bashford and partner Jack Guillaume were charged with cheating the City of San Francisco out of $1 million in rent.

In popular culture
Wilkes Bashford merchandise is an "addiction" for a wealthy closeted gay character, Beauchamp Day, in Armistead Maupin's eponymous first book from the Tales of the City series, which is mostly set in San Francisco.

References

Clothing retailers of the United States
Union Square, San Francisco
Companies based in San Francisco
Bashford, Wilkes
Bashford, Wilkes
Bashford, Wilkes
Bashford, Wilkes
20th-century American businesspeople
1966 establishments in California
1966 in San Francisco